Prized (May 20, 1986 – July 20, 2014) is an American Thoroughbred racehorse.

Background
Prized was bred in Florida by Meadowbrook Farm who raced him in partnership with Clover Racing Stable. He was by the very successful sire Kris S., a son of Epsom Derby winner Roberto, and out of the mare My Turbulent Miss.

Racing career
Trained by Neil Drysdale, Prized won the Grade I Molson Million on dirt.

Prized won the 1989 Breeders' Cup Turf in his first start on grass. His other most notable victory was a win over Sunday Silence in the 1989 Grade II Swaps Stakes..

Stud record
Prized was retired from racing to become a breeding stallion: he is the sire of multiple stakes winner Brass Hat and dual Auckland Cup winner Prize Lady.

Pedigree

References

1986 racehorse births
2014 racehorse deaths
Racehorses bred in Florida
Racehorses trained in the United States
Breeders' Cup Turf winners
Thoroughbred family 8-c